Year 1162 (MCLXII) was a common year starting on Monday (link will display the full calendar) of the Julian calendar.

Events 
 By place 

 Europe 
 March 6 – German forces, led by Emperor Frederick I (Barbarossa), capture Milan; much of the city is destroyed three weeks later, on the emperor's orders. The fortifications are demolished, and the churches are destroyed. The population is dispersed, and the commune abolished. The fate of Milan leads to the submission of Brescia, Piacenza, and many other northern Italian cities.
 July 7 – Norwegian forces under the pretender Magnus V (Erlingsson) defeat the 15-year-old King Haakon II (Sigurdsson), who is killed in battle in Romsdal after a 5-year reign. 
 July 15 – Ladislaus II, duke of Bosnia, is declared king of Hungary and Croatia. He is crowned by Archbishop Mikó and grants one-third of the kingdom to his brother, Stephen IV.

 England 
 June 3 – King Henry II has his chancellor Thomas Becket elected to succeed the late Theobald of Bec as archbishop of Canterbury. He accepts the pallium send by Pope Alexander III.

 Africa 
 The Almohad emir, Abd al-Mu'min, prepares a gigantic fleet of some four hundred ships to invade Al-Andalus (modern Spain). He dies the following year, before the fleet is completed.

 China 
 July 24 – Emperor Gao Zong becomes embroiled in war again as hostilities resume with the Jurchen-led Jin Dynasty (or Great Jin) after 21 years of peace. Another peace treaty is signed, Gao abdicates the throne in favor of his adopted son Xiao Zong. The smaller Southern Song empire becomes richer than the Song Dynasty.

 By topic 

 Religion 
 The Beisi Pagoda (or North Temple Pagoda) is completed during the Song Dynasty.

Births 
 March 5 – Ogasawara Nagakiyo, Japanese warrior (d. 1242)
 March 11 – Theodoric I, margrave of Meissen (d. 1221)
 June 20 – Benchō, Japanese Buddhist patriarch (d. 1238)
 June 30 – Yang (or Gongsheng), Chinese empress (d. 1233)
 Abd al-Latif al-Baghdadi, Abbasid traveler and writer (d. 1231)
 Fujiwara no Teika, Japanese poet and calligrapher (d. 1241)
 Gebre Mesqel, ruler of the Ethiopian Empire (d. 1221)
 Genghis Khan, founder of the Mongol Empire (d. 1227)
 Geoffrey Fitz Peter, 1st Earl of Essex (approximate date)
 Guillem de Cabestany, Spanish troubadour (d. 1212)
 Kajiwara Kagesue, Japanese nobleman (d. 1200)
 Renier of Montferrat, Byzantine politician (d. 1183)

Deaths 
 February 18 – Theotonius, Portuguese advisor (b. 1082)
 May 31 – Géza II, king of Hungary and Croatia (b. 1130)
 July 7 – Haakon II (Sigurdsson), king of Norway (b. 1147)
 July 29 – Guigues V, count of Albon and Grenoble (b. 1125)
 July 31 – Fujiwara no Tadazane, Japanese nobleman (b. 1078)
 August 6 – Ramon Berenguer IV, count of Barcelona (b. 1114)
 September 27 – Odo II, duke of Burgundy (b. 1118)
 Adalbert of Pomerania, German missionary and bishop
 Angharad ferch Owain, queen of Gwynedd (b. 1065)
 Odo of Deuil (or Eudes), French abbot and historian
 Henry Aristippus (or Henricus), Italian chancellor
 Hugh de Morville, Norman nobleman and knight
 Ibn Zuhr (or Avenzoar), Moorish physician (b. 1094)
 Judith of Baden, German margravine
 Richard de Belmeis II, English bishop and politician
 Sylvester of Marsico, Norman nobleman (b. 1100)
 Tiantong Zongjue, Chinese Buddhist monk (b. 1091)

References